Lolis is a Greek surname and American given name. Notable people with the name include:

Surname
 Alexandros Lolis (born 2002), Greek professional footballer
 Jon Lolis, Albanian-Greek actor

Given name
 Lolis Elie (died 2017), American lawyer and civil rights activist
 Lolis Eric Elie (born 1963), American writer, journalist, documentary filmmaker, and food historian

See also
 Loli (disambiguation)
 Lolicon, also called loli (plural lolis), a sexualized childlike female character in Japanese anime and manga